The 1925 Alabama Crimson Tide baseball team represented the Alabama Crimson Tide of the University of Alabama in the 1925 NCAA baseball season, winning the Southern Conference championship.  The team featured Red Barnes and Grant Gillis.

References

Alabama Crimson Tide
Alabama Crimson Tide baseball seasons
Southern Conference baseball champion seasons
1925 in sports in Alabama